The grave of Emerson H. Liscum, also known as Emerson Hamilton Grave, is an outdoor public artwork located at Arlington National Cemetery in Arlington, Virginia, United States. This sculpture was surveyed in 1995 as part of the Smithsonian Institution's "Save Outdoor Sculpture!" program. The gravestone marks Liscum's final resting place.

References

External links
 
 Arlington National Cemetery

Arlington National Cemetery
Monuments and memorials in Virginia
Outdoor sculptures in Arlington, Virginia
Statues in Virginia